Jaime Martí Marcos (born 5 October 1979 in Madrid) is a Spanish sabre fencer. Marti represented Spain at the 2008 Summer Olympics in Beijing, where he competed in the men's individual sabre event, along with his teammate Jorge Pina. He defeated Russia's Nikolay Kovalev in the preliminary round of thirty-two, before losing out his next match to China's Zhong Man, with a sudden death score of 14–15.

References

External links
Profile – FIE
NBC 2008 Olympics profile

1979 births
Living people
Spanish male sabre fencers
Olympic fencers of Spain
Fencers at the 2008 Summer Olympics
Fencers from Madrid